Leena Yadav (born 6 January 1971) is an Indian film director, producer, screenwriter and editor. She started her career in the television industry and gradually moved on to making feature films. Her first international feature film, Parched, premiered at the Toronto International Film Festival in 2015.

Early life and education
Born to an Indian Army general in Madhya Pradesh, she graduated with Economics honours from Lady Shri Ram College for Women, Delhi. She did Mass Communications from Sophia College, Mumbai.

Personal life
She is married to Aseem Bajaj (son of Ram Gopal Bajaj and maternal grandson of Khemchand Prakash), who is an Indian cinematographer and film producer well known for his poetic imagery on films like Hazaaron Khwaishein Aisi, Shabd, Teen Patti, U Me Aur Hum and Chameli to name a few. She met Aseem while directing her first TV show This Week That Year.

Filmography
Having captivated by the job of Film editing, while she was working with a diploma in Mass Communications background, she learned Film editing. Without working as an assistant to anyone, she learned about direction and script writing from editing itself. While working as an editor for 'ad films' – corporate shows – and television serials, she got an offer to direct a Television (TV) show This Week That Year for Star Movies. With success, she floated her own production house with Nikhil Kapoor to produce and direct shows for Star Bestsellers.

As a TV director, she directed both fiction and non-fiction for almost 12 years; some of the TV shows that she directed included singular episodes for Star Bestsellers, Say Na Something to Anupam Uncle, Sanjeevani, and many more.

As a mainstream film director, Shabd was her directorial debut with unconventional storyline, released in 2005. Teen Patti was her second film after a gap of five years. Parched is the latest movie directed by her, starring Tannishtha Chatterjee, Radhika Apte, Surveen Chawla and Adil Hussain playing lead roles.

As director
Films

TV show
 This Week That Year – for Star Movies.
 Say Na Something to Anupam Uncle.
 Sanjeevani.
 Goonj – for Sony TV.
 Kahin Na Kahi Koi Ha – a match-making show with Madhuri Dixit.
 Temptation Island.
 Dead End.
 Khauf

Documentary
House of Secrets: The Burari Deaths (2021)

References

External links
 
 What's making Leena Yadav worried?
 Latest Films directed by Leena Yadav
 INTERVIEW: Director: Leena Yadav
 Big B perfect at tennis, violin, piano: Director Leena Yadav
 Let the game begin – Leena Yadav explores gambling and its psychology in ‘Teen Patti'.
 “The story of Teen Patti is a metaphor for life” – Leena Yadav
 Bollywood previews – Teen Patti – A high tension drama based on gambling to prove a mathematical theory.
 After ‘Kites’, Hollywood editor for ‘Teen Patti’

Indian women film directors
1971 births
Living people
Lady Shri Ram College alumni
Sophia College for Women alumni
Indian women film producers
Film producers from Madhya Pradesh
Indian women screenwriters
Indian women film editors
Film editors from Madhya Pradesh
Hindi-language film directors
Indian women television directors
Indian television directors
Indian women television producers
Indian television producers
Indian television writers
Indian women television writers
21st-century Indian women writers
21st-century Indian writers
21st-century Indian dramatists and playwrights
21st-century Indian film directors
Women writers from Madhya Pradesh
Hindi screenwriters
Screenwriters from Madhya Pradesh
Film directors from Madhya Pradesh
Hindi film editors
Women artists from Madhya Pradesh
Businesswomen from Madhya Pradesh
Women television producers
21st-century Indian screenwriters